The 2013 Yas Marina GP3 Series round was a GP3 Series motor race held on November 2 and 3, 2013 at Yas Marina Circuit, Abu Dhabi. It was the season finale of the 2013 GP3 Series. The race supported the 2013 Abu Dhabi Grand Prix.

Classification

Qualifying

Feature Race

Sprint Race

See also 
 2013 Abu Dhabi Grand Prix
 2013 Yas Marina GP2 Series round

References

Yas Marina
GP3
Yas Marina